The Waiwera River is a river in New Zealand, a tributary of the Clutha River.

See also
List of rivers of New Zealand

References

Rivers of Otago
Rivers of New Zealand